Jile Temple of Harbin, China, is the biggest Buddhist building complex in Heilongjiang and was constructed between 1921 and 1924. The grounds cover 53,500 square metres and the buildings 5,186 square metres. It is located at No. 5 East Dazhi Street, Nangang Dist. in Harbin.

Buddhist temples in China
Buildings and structures in Harbin
Religion in Heilongjiang